Long Island Creek is a stream in Fulton County in the U.S. state of Georgia. It is a tributary to the Chattahoochee River.

Long Island Creek takes its name from a long river island near its mouth.

References

Rivers of Georgia (U.S. state)
Rivers of Fulton County, Georgia